Henri Paret (28 November 1929 – 17 August 1999) was a French racing cyclist. He finished in last place in the 1952 Tour de France.

References

External links

1929 births
1999 deaths
French male cyclists
Place of birth missing